Salmonella Men on Planet Porno (2006) is a collection of short stories by Japanese science fiction and metafiction writer Yasutaka Tsutsui, in English translation by Andrew Driver. Not to be confused with the original Japanese collection ポルノ惑星のサルモネラ人間 (Poruno Wakusei no Sarumonera Ningen), these stories have been selected from a number of works written by Yasutaka Tsutsui.

First published by Alma Books in the UK, a US edition was produced by Pantheon Books (Random House) in November 2008.

Stories in the collection
 The Dabba Dabba Tree
 Rumours About Me
 Don't Laugh
 Farmer Airlines
 Bear's Wood Main Line
 The Very Edge of Happiness
 Commuter Army
 Hello, Hello, Hello!
 The World is Tilting
 Bravo Herr Mozart!
 The Last Smoker
 Bad for the Heart
 Salmonella Men on Planet Porno

Rumours About Me was reproduced in the US literary magazine Zoetrope in its Summer 2008 issue.

A radio dramatisation of The Last Smoker was broadcast on the UK's BBC Radio 4 on 20 February 2009.

A radio dramatisation of the title story, "Salmonella Men on Planet Porno", was broadcast on BBC Radio 3 on 28 February 2009.

External links
Alma Books (UK) official website
Pantheon Books (US) official website

2006 short story collections
Works by Yasutaka Tsutsui
Japanese short story collections